The Mürren tramway was a horse-drawn, and later human-powered tramway located in Mürren, Switzerland that operated between 1894 and 1937.

History 
In 1893, to connect his hotel with the railway station of the Lauterbrunnen-Murren cable car, Johann Sterchi-Wettach, owner of the then Grand Hotel and Kurhaus Mürren, contracted with the company A. Oehler in Wildegg for a  tramway to bring his guests from BLM station. The operation was stopped because it failed to submit a concession application.

On 13 April 1894, the Federal Assembly approved the federal decree concerning the concession of the Mürren runway. The Federal Council granted the operating license on 10 July 1894 and the tramway began operation. During the three-month summer season, there are 3 to 5 daily trips back and forth. The one-way fare is 30 cents per person, which is approximately equal to the hourly wage of a worker.

At , the Murren runway had the smallest gauge of all Swiss railways with federal concession for passenger transport. The rails were laid in the street, and three vehicles were purchased, including a covered passenger car consisting of two benches length-ways on either side, and two goods vehicles.

All vehicles were pulled by horse. Services were suspended from 1914 until the summer season of 1920. In 1930 when passenger services were discontinued. Afterwards, the goods carts were pushed by hand, until 1937 when the tramway closed permanently.

The tracks were left disused until the 1960s when, during street renovations, the tracks were either torn up or paved-over. The fate of the goods carts is unknown, however the passenger car remained and has been restored and placed inside the BLM station on display. The Grand Hotel and Kurhaus closed in 1945 and were eventually demolished in 1954.

Route  
The tramway started with a two-track station in the street outside the existing BLM station and followed the main village road until the Kurhaus. A switch was installed just before the Kurhaus in order to allow future expansion to other hotels, however this never occurred and the switch was left unused. In the hotel area, the tramway ended with three tracks: the passenger track, which led to the hotel's entrance, and two more goods tracks, which led to the hotel's service area. The journey took around 7 minutes to complete.

References

External links 
 Illustrated article on the tramway (in German)

Closed railway lines in Switzerland
Horse-drawn railways
Railway lines opened in 1894
Railway lines closed in 1937
Tram transport in Switzerland